Wanna Be (Wannabe on cover) is the second single album of South Korean girl group AOA. It was released on October 10, 2012 by FNC Entertainment. Its also marked their last releases as eight-member group before Youkyung departure in October 2016.

Release 
The first teaser for the title song "Get Out" music video was released on September 28, 2012 and featured all of the girls as different iconic female leads from cinema history. It was then followed up by the second teaser on October 7 which gave a glimpse of the girls performing the choreography and playing instruments.

The music video for "Get Out" was released October 9, two days earlier than stated in the teasers as a gift to the fans because it was so heavily requested.  On October 10, AOA released a behind the scenes look at the making of the "Get Out" music video.

The booming, opening track "Get Out" is the title song from the single. It has an edgy rock sound featuring lead vocals from Choa. The upbeat nature of the song was intended to speak to "teenage hearts". "Get Out" appears in its "band version" on this release featuring more instrumentation than the "original version" released later to accompany their Japanese single, "Miniskirt". The "original version" is more in line with their other releases at it features a more electro-pop sound. The second song, "Happy Ending" is a more mellow ballad. The catchy chorus and simplistic lyrics give the song a light and poppy feel, showcasing the girls cute and innocent side. The final track, "My Song", is a more uplifting and stylized record featuring full band instrumentation and vocal dominance from Choa once again. This single marked the last appearance of Youkyung in the full group before her departure in October 2016.

Concept 
For this album, the girls all sported strong, lead female characters from popular movies. Chanmi was Hermione from Harry Potter, ChoA was Elle Woods from Legally Blonde, Hyejeong was The Bride from Kill Bill, Jimin played Mathilda from Léon: The Professional, Mina was Holly Golightly from Breakfast at Tiffany's, Seolhyun was Juliet from Romeo and Juliet, Youkyung depicted Leeloo from The Fifth Element, and Yuna was Lara Croft from Tomb Raider.

Track listing
Digital and CD single:

Charts

References

AOA (group) albums
2012 albums
Korean-language albums
Single albums
Dance-pop albums by South Korean artists
FNC Entertainment albums